Tunnskärshällorna is a group of Swedish islands belonging to the Kalix archipelago. It is located to the south-east of the village Båtskärsnäs. The ten smaller islands have no shore connection. On the two larger islands of the group, there are some summer houses.

References 

Islands of Norrbotten County
Swedish islands in the Baltic